Amud Cave is located in the Upper Galilee, in the Nahal Amud gorge. The cave was excavated by a Japanese expedition in 1961 and, again, in 1964. Excavations were renewed in 1990 by a joint Israeli-American team that included archaeologists, anatomists and anthropologists. Two major phases of occupation have been identified on the site: the later one beginning at around 3000 BC, characterized by numerous pottery sherds, stone tools and garbage pits (that often disturb lower layers) but no permanent structures, and an earlier one from the Middle Paleolithic. The most important find from this site is Amud 1, discovered in 1961, in the latest Paleolithic layers, that were later dated, using thermoluminescence, to 50-60,000 years BP. It has been classified as Neanderthal, which makes it the youngest Neanderthal ever to have been discovered in the Levant.

Further reading 
 Amud 1

References

Caves of Israel
Archaeology of Israel
Prehistoric Israel
Archaeological sites in Israel
1961 archaeological discoveries
Asian archaeology
Upper Galilee
Neanderthal sites